TV Edukasi (Educational TV, formerly TVE) is an Indonesian television station owned by Ministry of Education, Culture, Research, and Technology. It serves to spread information to the education sector.

History 
The station was made official by the Minister of National Education Abdul Malik Fadjar on 12 October 2004.

As a part of widening TVE's reach to larger Indonesian audiences, TVE partnered with Indonesian public television network TVRI — under the partnership the TVE daytime broadcasts was relayed by TVRI starting in 2004. The partnership ends in the early 2010s. In 2021, a programming block Belajar dari Rumah which was aired in the same partnership in midst of COVID-19 pandemic in Indonesia was moved to the station after almost a year in TVRI.

Affiliations 
 Space Toon (2005-2013)
 TVRI (2004-2014)
 Sindo TV (2014-2015)
 O Channel (2004-2012)

See also 
 List of television stations in Indonesia

References

External links 
  

Educational and instructional television channels
Television stations in Indonesia
Television channels and stations established in 2004
2004 establishments in Indonesia